Toppers is an unincorporated community in Wagoner County, Oklahoma, United States, situated on Fort Gibson Lake.

Demographics

References

Unincorporated communities in Oklahoma
Unincorporated communities in Wagoner County, Oklahoma